The Tarou River is a river on the Caribbean island of Dominica near Mahaut.

See also
List of rivers of Dominica
Map of Dominica
GEOnet Names Server

References

Rivers of Dominica